The Joslin Dry Goods Company Building (also known as the Tramp Building or the Joslin Building) is a historic building in downtown Denver, Colorado.

Description and history 
Joslins Department Store began as Joslin Dry Goods Company founded by John Jay Joslin in 1873; It was a direct competitor to The Denver Dry Goods Company which commenced operations in 1888. 
Joslin's Dry Goods later evolved into a department store and was purchased by Mercantile Stores, a Fairfield, Ohio-based department store conglomerate. 

The building was designed by Denver architect Frank E. Edbrooke and renovated in 1902, 1927, and 1964. The company rebranded as Joslins following the 1964 remodel, which also significantly altered the building's exterior.

It was listed on the U.S. National Register of Historic Places in 1997. The building was redeveloped as a 177-room Courtyard by Marriott hotel shortly thereafter.

References

External links
Courtyard Denver Downtown
National Register of Historic Places
Directory of Colorado State Register Properties

Economy of Denver
National Register of Historic Places in Denver
Department stores on the National Register of Historic Places
Commercial buildings on the National Register of Historic Places in Colorado
Courtyard by Marriott hotels